North East Lincolnshire is a Unitary authority area with borough status in Lincolnshire, England. It borders the borough of North Lincolnshire and districts of West Lindsey and East Lindsey. The population of the district in the 2011 Census was 159,616. The administrative centre and largest settlement is Grimsby and the borough includes the towns of Cleethorpes and Immingham as well as the villages of New Waltham, Waltham, Humberston, Healing and Great Coates. The borough is also home to the Port of Grimsby and Port of Immingham as well as Cleethorpes beach.

History

North East Lincolnshire was created from the boroughs of Cleethorpes and Great Grimsby on 1 April 1996 with the abolition of Humberside. The area lies within the Parts of Lindsey, a historic subdivision of Lincolnshire.

Geography
The borough is located at the northeastern tip of Lincolnshire and opposite East Riding of Yorkshire. It borders the River Humber and Humber Estuary. The area between Cleethorpes and Grimsby as well as the villages of Great Coates, Humberstone, New Waltham and Waltham form a large conurbation. Immingham is separated from the Grimsby urban area by the A180 and is a few miles west of the town.

Recent council results

Towns and villages
 Ashby cum Fenby 
 Aylesby
 Barnoldby le Beck
 Beelsby
 Bradley
 Brigsley
 Cleethorpes
 East Ravendale
 Great Coates
 Grimsby
 Habrough
 Hatcliffe
 Healing
 Humberston
 Immingham
 Irby upon Humber
 Laceby 
 Little Coates
 New Waltham
 Old Clee
 Scartho
 Stallingborough
 Waltham 
 Weelsby
 Wold Newton

Places of interest
 Waltham Windmill
 Cleethorpes Coast Light Railway
 Blundell Park (home of Grimsby Town Football Club)
 The Greenwich Meridian passes through the county.

Governance

North East Lincolnshire is a unitary authority that has operated a cabinet-style council since 2003. There are 42 councillors. They elect the cabinet in May each year. Each cabinet member is responsible for making decisions within their portfolio area.
The governance of North East Lincolnshire Council has come under scrutiny from the audit commission on two occasions leading to special public interest reports for its failings. During this time (between 2003 and 2011) it was run politically as a coalition between the Conservatives and Liberal Democrats. In June 2011 it became a minority Labour controlled Council. In 2012, Labour gained a majority on the authority, before losing it two years later and have run it as a minority. In 2019, the Conservatives managed to gain a majority for the first time since the establishment of the council in 1996.

Media
The radio station for the area was called Compass FM, and took its logo from the logo of North East Lincolnshire, being based south of Grimsby railway station. It became part of Greatest Hits Radio in 2020. BBC Radio Humberside have a small studio to the east of Grimsby town centre. Grimsby Institute had the innovative Estuary TV (former Channel 7) television, based at the Grimsby Institute of Further & Higher Education. Propeller TV was also part of Grimsby Institute. The Grimsby Telegraph is a daily newspaper.

Economy
The North East Lincolnshire towns of Grimsby, Immingham and Cleethorpes, form the economic area known as Greater Grimsby. The main sectors of the Greater Grimsby economy are food and drink; ports and logistics; renewable energy and chemicals and process industries.

This is a table of trend of regional gross value added of North and North East Lincolnshire at current basic prices publisher, (pp. 240–253) by the Office for National Statistics with figures in millions of British pounds sterling.

The area has one power station, the South Humber Bank Power Station, which is owned and operated by Centrica sited at Stallingborough.

Similar to North Lincolnshire, the area has its fire and police run by Humberside Fire and Rescue Service and Humberside Police.

Transport

There are four main roads that link to the unitary authority - the A180 (from the M180) which was built in 1984, and the A46 from Lincoln. The A46 terminates in Cleethorpes, previously terminating at the Laceby roundabout, and follows the former route of the A18 through Grimsby and Cleethorpes. The A18 which runs from Doncaster  to Laceby past the Humberside  Airport. And the A16  from southern Lincolnshire  through Louth, Entering the town at toll bar roundabout Waltham

There are good connections by railway from Doncaster and Sheffield, which start at Manchester Airport - the TransPennine Express.

It is transport by sea that the area has national significance. The two ports of Immingham and Grimsby, when combined, have the largest tonnage of freight of any UK port. Immingham has many DFDS freight routes (DFDS Seaways since 2010, the former DFDS Tor Line) to Europe.

Education

The local LEA has comprehensive schools, becoming comprehensive in the early 1970s when part of the County Borough of Grimsby, and the Lindsey Education Committee, based in Lincoln. However, due to the proximity of West and East Lindsey which have grammar schools, some children capable of passing the eleven-plus are bussed over the border to places such as Caistor, Louth, and Alford. Previous to this Cleethorpes had girls' and boys' grammar schools, and Grimsby had the girls' and boys' (which joined in the late 1960s) Wintringham grammar schools.

The local secondary schools have improved in recent years, but Grimsby still has some of the worst GCSE results in the country. There is a clear cut dichotomy of education up to 16, with schools on the edge of Grimsby and Cleethorpes performing with respectable results, leaving the centre of these towns with struggling schools that have faced closure. Most schools have converted to Academy status, with some also lucky enough to move into brand new spacious buildings. It is more the case that affluent parents would refuse to send their children to schools in central Grimsby, hence the schools on the outer edge do much better.

Franklin College has a good reputation at A level, and regularly produces the best A level results for state schools in the former area of Humberside (north and south). It was formed by the Humberside Education Committee, based in Beverly. Sixth formers travelled from East and West Lindsey to attend this college, such was its reputation.

The main FE college in Grimsby is the Grimsby Institute. This offers a wide range of vocational courses and has links with the fishing industry. It offers higher education courses, and has done for many years - HNDs, for vocational subjects. It has the long-term ambition to become a university. The University of Humberside used to have its food science campus at the college, but removed this when it became the University of Lincoln.

Freedom of the Borough
The following people and military units have received the Freedom of the Borough of North East Lincolnshire.

Individuals
 2008: Mrs. Muriel Barker, Leader of North East Lincolnshire Borough Council.
 17 May 2019: Mr. Andrew De Freitas, Leader of North East Lincolnshire Borough Council.

Military Units
 45 Commando, RM: 16 May 2015.

References

External links
 Invest North East Lincolnshire - official site promoting the area to inward investor

 
Local government in Lincolnshire
Unitary authority districts of England
Local government districts of Yorkshire and the Humber
Boroughs in England